Mohammad Asad Ali Khan Junejo is a Pakistani politician who has been a Member of the Senate of Pakistan, since March 2018.

Biography
Junejo was born to a former Prime Minister of Pakistan Muhammad Khan Junejo. He received his education from the St. Patrick's High School, Karachi.

In December 2015, Junejo was made President of Pakistan Muslim League (Q) Sindh.

In August 2017, Junejo joined Pakistan Muslim League (N) (PML-N).

Junejo was nominated by PML-N as its candidate in 2018 Pakistani Senate election. However the Election Commission of Pakistan declared all PML-N candidates for the Senate election as independent after a ruling of the Supreme Court of Pakistan.

Junejo was elected to the Senate of Pakistan as an independent candidate on general seat from Islamabad in the Senate election. He was backed in the election by PML-N and decided to join the treasury benches, led by PML-N after getting elected. He took oath as Senator on 12 March 2018.

References

Living people
Pakistan Muslim League (N) politicians
Members of the Senate of Pakistan
Year of birth missing (living people)
Children of prime ministers of Pakistan
St. Patrick's High School, Karachi alumni